Social contract is a broad class of theories that try to explain the ways in which people form states and/or maintain social order.

Social Contract may also refer to:

Policies
Social Contract (Britain), a policy of the British Labour party in the 1970s
Social contract (Malaysia), an agreement concerning citizenship rights
Social Contract (Ontario), a 1993 wage restraint initiative in Ontario

Books
The Social Contract, a book Jean-Jacques Rousseau published in 1762
The Social Contract (1970 book), a paleoanthropology book by Robert Ardrey

Other
"The Social Contract" (House), an episode of House
The Social Contract Press, a printing company
Debian Social Contract, which frames the moral agenda of the Debian project

See also
 Contractualism, ethical theories based on social contract theory